Capo Scaramia Lighthouse is an active lighthouse located in Punta Secca in the municipality of Santa Croce Camerina, Sicily.

Description
The lighthouse was built in 1859 and consists of one-storey amber building and a cylindrical masonry tower, with balcony and lantern, on the seaside front. The light is operated by the Marina Militare and it is identified by the code number 1884 E.F.

In popular culture
The lighthouse has gained fame in the RAI television series Inspector Montalbano. Many scenes with Montalbano's fictional home are set in a house nearby the lighthouse.

See also
 List of lighthouses in Italy
 Punta Secca

References

External links 

 Servizio fari Marina Militare 

Lighthouses in Italy